ClanLib is a video game SDK, supporting Microsoft Windows, macOS, and Linux, with partial support for mobile platforms. It has full hardware accelerated graphics support through OpenGL, and also a software renderer. ClanLib also helps in playing sound, using the Vorbis or MikMod libraries, and has classes for collision detection, GUIs, XML, networking, and other things that may be helpful to a game programmer.

The earliest known public release is in 1999 (Version 0.1.18). Introduction to C++ Game Programming, published June 2007, dedicates a chapter to "Learn how to use the ClanLib library to make 2D games". Also Game Programming with Python, Lua, and Ruby, published December 2003, has a chapter about using ClanLib together with Ruby.

See also 

 Allegro
 Raylib
 SDL
 SFML

References

External links 
 

Application programming interfaces
Audio libraries
C++ libraries
Cross-platform software
Free game engines
Graphics libraries
Linux APIs
MacOS APIs
Software using the zlib license
Video game development software
Windows APIs